Edward Albert Zmich (October 1, 1884 – August 20, 1950) was an American professional baseball pitcher. He played parts of two seasons in Major League Baseball with the St. Louis Cardinals in 1910–1911. His first ever game was in 1910 at the age of 25. His last game was one year later in 1911.

He did not attend college. He batted and threw left-handed.

He is buried at St. Mary Cemetery in Cleveland, Ohio.

References

Baseball Almanac

Major League Baseball pitchers
St. Louis Cardinals players
Marion Diggers players
Chillicothe Infants players
Springfield Senators players
Baseball players from Cleveland
1884 births
1950 deaths
Staunton Speakers players